is an anime series, and the first to be produced by Bones. The series was first aired on NHK BS-2 and ran for twenty six episodes, from October 24, 2000, till May 1, 2001. Created by Shō Aikawa and directed by Tetsurō Amino, the series' character designer and chief animation director was the late Hiroshi Ōsaka.

The series was subsequently aired by the anime television network Animax, who also aired it across its English language networks in Southeast Asia and South Asia.

Story
The series is set within the Meiji period of Japan, following a small boy named Hiwou. The townspeople have lived simply, making "Clockwork Dolls" or "karakuri" for festivals. Hiwou's father left the family on a long trip, and their mother has since died.  The children live with friends.

Their simple life vanishes when the "Wind Gang" appears, destroys the city with their own clockwork dolls, and captures its citizens. Hiwō and his siblings and friends, Shishi, Machi, Tetsu, Mayu, Sai, and baby Jyobu (who are exploring a cave at the time), escape unharmed and embark on a quest to save the town.  They take with them Homura, a huge clockwork doll that functions like a giant robot.

Along the way, they are forced to use their clockwork dolls as weapons - something they were never supposed to do, according to Hiwō's father. Early in the series, they meet Arashi, a member of the Wind Gang, and Hana and Yuki, two samurai daughters who ended up traveling with the group.

Hiwō and his friends encounter a number of historical figures, before these people entered the history books during the Meiji Restoration.

Production

Staff
Director: Tetsuro Amino
Music: Hiroshi Yamaguchi
Original creator: Shō Aikawa
Character Design: Hajime Jinguji, Hiroshi Osaka
Art director: Nobuto Sakamoto
Mecha design: Junya Ishigaki
Director of Photography: Youichi Ōgami
Color Coordination: Kenji Chiba
Historical Verification: Tetsunori Iwashita
Main Animation Director: Hiroshi Osaka
Sound director: Yasuo Uragami
Animation Production: BONES

Cast
Houko Kuwashima as Hiwō
Kaori Mizuhashi as Machi
Rikako Aikawa as Shishi
Akiko Yajima as Mayu
Haruna Ikezawa as Hana
Omi Minami as Yuki
Kazuhiko Inoue as Ryōma Sakamoto
Nobuo Tobita as Sai
Shinasichiro Miki as Arashi
Yoko Teppouzuka as Tetsu
Yuko Mizutani as Alexander
Yūji Takada as Aka
Masako Ebisu as Narrator
Chisato Nakajima as Child (ep 2)
Yukimasa Kishino as Gennosuke (ep 6)

Music

Opening theme
Hiwou no Theme by Hiroshi Yamaguchi

Ending theme
CROSSROAD by Kumiko Endō

References

External links
Official site
 

1999 manga
2000 anime television series debuts
Bandai Entertainment anime titles
Bones (studio)
Kodansha manga
NHK original programming
Films with screenplays by Shō Aikawa
Seinen manga